Enon is a village in Clark County, Ohio, United States. The population was 2,455 at the 2020 census. It is part of the Springfield, Ohio Metropolitan Statistical Area.

Enon is the headquarters of the Speedway gas station chain.

History
Enon was platted in 1838. It is named for the river Ænon, in Israel, where the story of John the Baptist baptizing people takes place. A post office called Enon has been in operation since 1838. The village was incorporated in 1850.  Mercury 7 astronaut Virgil I. "Gus" Grissom lived in Enon with his family while he was stationed at Wright-Patterson Air Force Base.

Geography
Enon is located at  (39.870309, -83.934462). The village sits roughly 3 miles south of the old National Road.

The Enon Adena Mound, also known as the Knob Prairie Mound, is Ohio's second largest conical Indian burial mound, is located in Enon.  This mound is believed to have been built by the Adena culture.

Demographics

The median income for a household in the village was $58,966, and the median income for a family was $69,196. Males had a median income of $45,335 versus $28,872 for females. The per capita income for the village was $29,537. About 2.4% of families and 2.8% of the population were below the poverty line, including 3.8% of those under age 18 and 1.8% of those age 65 or over.

2010 census
As of the census of 2010, there were 2,415 people, 1,069 households, and 732 families residing in the village. The racial makeup of the village was 96.6% White, 0.4% African American, 0.3% Native American, 1.3% Asian, 0.4% from other races, and 0.9% from two or more races. Hispanic or Latino of any race were 0.8% of the population.

There were 1,069 households, of which 24.2% had children under the age of 18 living with them, 55.2% were married couples living together, 10.0% had a female householder with no husband present, 3.3% had a male householder with no wife present, and 31.5% were non-families. 26.8% of all households were made up of individuals, and 10.7% had someone living alone who was 65 years of age or older. The average household size was 2.26 and the average family size was 2.71.

The median age in the village was 48.1 years. 19.1% of residents were under the age of 18; 6.4% were between the ages of 18 and 24; 18.8% were from 25 to 44; 34.8% were from 45 to 64; and 20.8% were 65 years of age or older. The gender makeup of the village was 48.7% male and 51.3% female.

Education
The village is served by the Greenon Local School District, which operates three schools: Enon Primary School, Indian Valley Intermediate School, and Greenon Junior/Senior High School. Enon has a public library, a branch of the Clark County Public Library.

References

External links
 Village website

Villages in Clark County, Ohio
Villages in Ohio
1838 establishments in Ohio
Populated places established in 1838